Roy Jackson may refer to:
Roy Jackson (American football) (fl. 1896–1900), early player for the Duquesne Country and Athletic Club
Roy Jackson (artist) (1944–2013), Australian contemporary artist
Roy Jackson (politician) (1895–1964), member of the Australian Labor Party
Roy Jackson (trade unionist) (1928–2010), British trade unionist
Roy Lee Jackson (born 1954), American baseball player